The gens Splattia or Splatia was an obscure plebeian family at ancient Rome.  Almost no members of this gens appear in history, but a few are known from inscriptions.  The most illustrious of the Splattii was Gaius Splattius, praetor in AD 29, during the reign of Tiberius.

Members

 Gaius Splattius, praetor urbanus in AD 29, and a member of the Arval Brethren.
 Marcus Splattius M. l. An[...], a freedman named in an inscription from Rome, dating between the middle of the first century, and the middle of the second.
 Splattia Corneliana, buried in a second-century tomb at Histonium in Samnium, dedicated by her mother, Mindia Tyche.
 Splattius Eutychus, dedicated a second- or third-century tomb at Histonium for his friend, Machario, aged thirty-five years, six months, along with Machario's mother, whose name has not been preserved.
 Splatia Nice, dedicated a second-century sepulchre at Aecae in Apulia for herself, her husband, Quintus Turranius Exoratus, and their daughter, Turrania Marcella, aged twenty-five years, two months.

See also
 List of Roman gentes

References

Bibliography
 Theodor Mommsen et alii, Corpus Inscriptionum Latinarum (The Body of Latin Inscriptions, abbreviated CIL), Berlin-Brandenburgische Akademie der Wissenschaften (1853–present).
 René Cagnat et alii, L'Année épigraphique (The Year in Epigraphy, abbreviated AE), Presses Universitaires de France (1888–present).
 August Pauly, Georg Wissowa, et alii, Realencyclopädie der Classischen Altertumswissenschaft (Scientific Encyclopedia of the Knowledge of Classical Antiquities, abbreviated RE or PW), J. B. Metzler, Stuttgart (1894–1980).
 Paul von Rohden, Elimar Klebs, & Hermann Dessau, Prosopographia Imperii Romani (The Prosopography of the Roman Empire, abbreviated PIR), Berlin (1898).

Roman gentes